Beijing Great Wall is a Chinese professional women's basketball club based in Beijing, playing in the Women's Chinese Basketball Association (WCBA). The team is owned by Beijing Shougang Co., Ltd., which also owns the Beijing Ducks men's basketball team. Beijing Great Wall sometimes also carries the name of its sponsor BBMG.

The team won 4 WCBA championships, first in 2012 and more recently from 2016 to 2018.

Season-by-season records

Current players 

}
}

}

}
}
}
}
}

}

Notable former players

 DeMya Walker (2002–03, 2004–05, 2009–10)
 Taiwo Rafiu (2004)
 Betty Lennox (2005–06)
 Jennifer Lacy (2008–09)
 Vanessa Hayden (2009)
 Jacinta Monroe (2010–11)
 Nicky Anosike (2011–12)
 Sophia Young (2012–13)
 Liz Cambage (2013–14)
 Brittney Griner (2014–15)
 Sylvia Fowles (2015–18)
 Imani McGee-Stafford (2017)
  Chien Wei-Chuan (2002, 2004–05)
 Kim Yeong-ok (2011–13)
 Park Se-mi (2013–14)
 Zhang Fan (2002–18)
 Zhang Wei (2007–09)
 Zhang Yu (2011–12)

References

External links
Beijing Great Wall - Asia-basket.com